The following is a list of Sites of Special Scientific Interest in the Badenoch and Strathspey Area of Search.  For other areas, see List of SSSIs by Area of Search.

 Abernethy Forest
 Allt Mor
 Allt na Feithe Sheilich
 Alvie
 Ben Alder And Aonach Beag
 Cairngorms
 Craigellachie SSSI, Badenoch and Strathspey
 Creag Dhubh
 Creag Meagaidh
 Drumochter Hills
 Glenmore Forest
 Kinlochlaggan Boulder Beds
 Kinveachy Forest
 Loch Etteridge
 Loch Vaa
 Moidach More
 Monadhliath
 North Rothiemurchus Pinewood
 Northern Corries, Cairngorms
 Parallel Roads of Lochaber
 River Feshie
 River Spey
 River Spey Insh Marshes

 
Badenoch and Strathspey